Mistress Pamela is a 1973 British sex comedy drama film directed by Jim O'Connolly and starring Ann Michelle,  Dudley Foster, Anna Quayle and Anthony Sharp. It was loosely based on the 1740 novel Pamela, or Virtue Rewarded by Samuel Richardson.

Plot
In the eighteenth century, Pamela, a servant girl in the household of Lord Devenish, must fight off the advances of her young master - a gentleman determined to have Pamela as his mistress.

Cast
 Ann Michelle as Pamela Andrews
 Julian Barnes as Lord Robert Devenish
 Dudley Foster as Jonathan
 Anna Quayle as Mrs Jelks
 Anthony Sharp as Longman
 Rosemarie Dunham as Mistress Blimper
 Derek Fowlds as Sir Percy
 Ken Parry as Parson
 Fred Emney as Dr Livesey
 Frederic Abbott as John Andrews
 Marianne Stone as Katie

Critical reception
Time Out wrote, "Richardson's 18th century classic Pamela clearly dredged up for its bawdy possibilities...About all the film has in common with the original is a notable lack of humour."

References

1973 films
1973 comedy-drama films
1970s historical comedy films
1970s English-language films
Films directed by Jim O'Connolly
Films based on British novels
British sex comedy films
British historical comedy-drama films
Films set in the 18th century
1970s sex comedy films
1970s British films